The Copa Conecta a Mexican football cup competition that was established in 2021.

The cup is played by 32 teams: 12 from the Liga Premier de México and 20 from the Liga TDP. 

The cup was created in 2021 with the aim of providing a greater opportunity for the development of football players from Liga Premier and Liga TDP teams.

Competition format
32 teams play in the cup: 12 from the Liga Premier de México and 20 from the Liga TDP. The twelve Liga Premier representatives are chosen as follows: five teams from Serie A and seven clubs from Serie B. The five teams in Serie A are those that finished in the worst third place in their group, those classified in fourth position and the champion of the reserve team league. The seven teams in Serie B are those that qualified for the play-offs of the Apertura Tournament.

The 20 teams in the Liga TDP are the 18 group leaders from the first half of the season and the two teams with the best coefficient.

The tournament consists of five stages:

 Round of 16
 Round of 8
 Quarter-Finals
 Semi-Finals 
 Final

The matches are played in a single round in the field of the team participating in the TDP League, in case the two teams play in the same league, the match will be played in the field of the best ranked team. If there is a tie at the end of regular time, a round of penalty kicks will be played to determine the winner.

Geographic location is the criteria for matches. The affiliated teams of Liga MX and Liga de Expansión MX can participate in the cup but only with the players who were registered in the squads for Liga Premier and TDP.

List of finals

List of winners

References